Edward Charlton (15 January 1888 – 20 January 1978) was an English footballer who played for Fulham and Carlisle United as a full back.

Career 
He spent the majority of his career at Fulham, making 249 league appearances and scoring 7 goals between 1906 and 1920, becoming the first player to make 100 appearances for the club. He spent the final couple of playing years at Carlisle United before announcing his retirement in 1923.

Personal life 
Charlton worked at J.L. Thompson and Sons during the First World War. He died in 1978 at 90 years old.

References

1888 births
1978 deaths
English footballers
Fulham F.C. players
Carlisle United F.C. players
English Football League players
Association football defenders